The Church of the Advent, Episcopal in Cynthiana, Kentucky is a historic church at 122 N. Walnut Street.  It was built in 1855 and added to the National Register in 1978.

It was deemed "architecturally significant as a fine adaptation of the Gothic Revival-a style traditionally deemed appropriate for churches of the Anglican Communion. Its seating capacity of eighty-five is symbolic of the religious fervor and optimism of the parish,-which recorded only eleven communicants and thirty-five Sunday School pupils at the time the cornerstone was laid. The building also attains merit through its association with the Right Reverend Benjamin Bosworth Smith, a pioneer Kentucky clergyman and educator."

Its square tower was completed in 1860.   It is built of limestone and has a Latin cross plan.

The church's website can be found at https://churchoftheadvent.us.

References

Episcopal church buildings in Kentucky
Churches on the National Register of Historic Places in Kentucky
Gothic Revival church buildings in Kentucky
Churches completed in 1855
19th-century Episcopal church buildings
National Register of Historic Places in Harrison County, Kentucky
1855 establishments in Kentucky
Cynthiana, Kentucky